The Texas Severe Storms Association (TESSA) is a national non-profit organization founded in 1993 by storm chaser Martin Lisius. Kim George currently serves as chairperson after Martin Lisius stepped down in 2015. The organization’s mission is to bring together both professional meteorologists and weather enthusiasts in an attempt to better understand dangerous storms through the collection and diffusion of knowledge. Its scope is national but focuses on Texas.

TESSA hosts the "National Storm Conference" every March in North Texas. One of the conference highlights is the "Super Storm Spotter" Training Session, which the organization bills as the most advanced storm spotter training available in the nation. The event attracts storm spotters, storm chasers, forecasters, researchers, educators, and emergency managers from across the United States.

In 1995, TESSA, in partnership with the National Weather Service, produced the StormWatch spotter training video, which is used nationally. StormWatch was written and directed by Martin Lisius and co-produced by meteorologists Alan Moller and Gary Woodall.

See also 
 Tornado

References

External links 
 TESSA website

Climate of Texas
Severe weather and convection
Non-profit organizations based in Texas
Storm chasing